Doirani railway station is a railway station that serves the nearby town of Doirani, in Kilkis in Central Macedonia, Greece. The station is located close to the Greek Military Cemetery of Doirani.

History
The station opened in 1896 as part of the Salonica Monastir railway, built by the Enotikos Thessalonica-Istanbul Company Built in the French architectural style when the line was opened. The station, along with the vital railhead, was annexed by Greece on 18 October 1912 during the First Balkan War. In the summer (July-August) of 1913, during the final phase of the Second Balkan War, the station was looted by retreating Bulgarian troops. recodered for posterity by postcards printed depicting the events. 

On 17 October 1925, The Greek government purchased the Greek sections of the former Salonica Monastir railway, and the railway became part of the Hellenic State Railways, with the remaining section north of Florina seeded to Yugoslavia. On 20 August 1944, during the German Occupation, a German guard was attacked by ELAS forces. In 1970, OSE became the legal successor to the SEK, taking over responsibilities for most of Greece's rail infrastructure. On 1 January 1971, the station and most of the Greek rail infrastructure were transferred to the Hellenic Railways Organisation S.A., a state-owned corporation. The station closed in 1987 as it was not included in the design of the new Thessaloniki-Istanbul railway line. Freight traffic declined sharply when the state-imposed monopoly of OSE for the transport of agricultural products and fertilisers ended in the early 1990s. Many small stations of the network with little passenger traffic were closed down.

In 2001 the infrastructure element of OSE was created, known as GAIAOSE; it would henceforth be responsible for the maintenance of stations, bridges and other elements of the network, as well as the leasing and the sale of railway assists. In 2003, OSE launched "Proastiakos SA", as a subsidiary to serve the operation of the suburban network in the urban complex of Athens during the 2004 Olympic Games. In 2005, TrainOSE was created as a brand within OSE to concentrate on rail services and passenger interface.

On 9 September 2007, the station reopened. In 2008, all Proastiakos services were transferred from OSE to TrainOSE. In 2009, with the Greek debt crisis unfolding OSE's Management was forced to reduce services across the network. Timetables were cut back, and routes closed as the government-run entity attempted to reduce overheads. Services from Thessaloniki and Alexandroupolis were reduced from six to just two trains a day, reducing the reliability of services and passenger numbers. In 2017 OSE's passenger transport sector was privatised as TrainOSE, currently a wholly-owned subsidiary of Ferrovie dello Stato Italiane infrastructure, including stations, remained under the control of OSE. Since 2020, the station has been served by the Proastiakos Thessaloniki services to New Railway Station. 

In Early 2022 Minister of Infrastructure and Transport Costas Karamanlis, announced from 4 February, an additional route will be operated every day, calling at Mouries, Doirani, Hersos, Kristoni, Pedinou and Galliko Kilkis. In July 2022, the station began being served by Hellenic Train, the rebranded TranOSE The move was welcomed by the mayor of Serres, Alexandros Chrysafis.

Facilities
The old station building is a village landmark but is no longer used. It now houses a cafeteria and refreshment bar, however it is still owned by GEOSE A. E. The newer station building has recently been repaired and upgraded; however, it is closed. The single platform is unpaved; as of (2021) the station is unstaffed, with no staffed booking office and just simple waiting rooms. Access to the platforms is via crossing the lines. The platforms have no outside seating, Dot-matrix display departure and arrival screens or timetable poster boards for passenger information. The station remains little more than an unstaffed halt, subject to vandalism and neglect.

Services
It is served by long-distance Regional services between Thessaloniki and Alexandroupolis, as well as a signal Proastiakos stopping service from Thessaloniki.

Station layout

References

Railway stations in Central Macedonia
Railway stations opened in 1896